Thuon Burtevitz, (born 27 August 1973) is a German composer.

Life 
Born in Halle (Saale), Burtevitz first studied philosophy at the Technical University of Dresden, then changed to the Hochschule für Musik Carl Maria von Weber as a student of Jörg Herchet. Since then she has been living as a freelance composer in Dresden.

Work 
Burtevitz developed her own tuning system for the piano work "Axia" (ancient Greek: "fundamental value") which lasts a good one and a half hours. In this system all intervals have a different size. For example, there are five different fifths. The octaves are also unequal. With this tuning system a strict order of tones is created, which nevertheless remains open to infinity. The form and rhythms of "axia" are also based on the tuning system.

Awards 
 Scholarship of the Mozart Foundation, Frankfurt 2004
 Working scholarships of the  2006 and 2009
 Composition prize of the state capital Stuttgart 2008 für Rabba in Sard… (violin and prepared piano)

References

External links 
 Thuon Burtevitz in Archiv Contemporary composer of the Saxon State and University Library Dresden
 

21st-century German composers
German women composers
1973 births
Living people
People from Halle (Saale)